Melanie Iglesias (born June 18, 1987, in Brooklyn, New York) is an American model and actress. After being voted Maxim's "Hometown Hotties" winner in 2010, she has been featured in magazines such as World's Most Beautiful, Esquire, and Vibe.

Iglesias has appeared in the World Poker Tour series and also appeared as herself on all seasons of Guy Code and Girl Code, both of which air on MTV. She also stars in the Guy Code spin off Guy Court.

Early life
Melanie Iglesias was born in Brooklyn, New York. Iglesias is of Puerto Rican, Italian, and Filipino heritage. She graduated from Tottenville High School on Staten Island in New York City.

Career
In 2010, Iglesias was voted Maxim's Hometown Hotties winner, and in 2011 Maxim placed her on their annual list for the world's most beautiful women, the "Maxim Hot 100". She was also featured on a special edition cover of Maxim USA, which was on stands for three consecutive months. She was number 87 on FHM 100 Sexiest of 2015.

In 2011, she was featured in the premiere issue of World's Most Beautiful, a 3D magazine photographed by celebrity photographer Nick Saglimbeni. She won the number two slot in Vibe Magazine'''s "30 Sexiest Celebrities Under 30".

Iglesias appeared as the Royal Flush Girl in 265 episodes of the World Poker Tour. She has appeared as herself on all three seasons of Guy Code, and was then cast in a spin-off show called Girl Code which airs on MTV every Thursday. She is also starring in yet another Guy Code spin off, Guy Court as the bailiff. She also starred in her first feature film, released in March 2018, Abnormal Attraction.

She appeared in Bryce Vine's music video for "La La Land" in April 2019.

FilmographyWorld Poker Tour – Royal Flush GirlGuy Code – herself (2011–13)Girl Code – herself (2013)Guy Court – bailiff (2013)MLB Off the Bat – herself (2014)Tosh.0 – Stacey (2014)Abnormal Attraction - Catherine (2018)

See alsoGuy Code''

References

External links

Interviews
Melanie Iglesias - Empire State of Mind (October 12, 2010)
Interview with Maxim's Hometown Hottie of 2010: Melanie Iglesias (December 20, 2010)
2010 Maxim Hometown Hotties Winner: Melanie Iglesias  - Video Interview (2010)

1987 births
Living people
21st-century American actresses
Female models from New York (state)
American actresses of Filipino descent
American actresses of Puerto Rican descent
American people of Italian descent